Inverness River is a stream in Alberta, Canada.

Inverness River takes its name from Inverness, in Scotland.

See also
List of rivers of Alberta

References

Rivers of Alberta